Maritime Services Training Institute (MSTI) is a post-secondary educational institution in Hong Kong which provides training in maritime services.

The MSTI was previously known as the Seamen's Training Centre; its name was changed to in 2003 to reflect a broader scope. Part of the impetus for the MSTI's establishment was to provide training, and opportunities for those engaged in marine-related industries, and to make careers in marine services more attractive to the younger generation.

References

1988 establishments in Hong Kong
2003 establishments in Hong Kong
Educational institutions established in 1988
Educational institutions established in 2003
Universities and colleges in Hong Kong
Tai Lam Chung